Agirtamak (Ägertamaq) is a rural locality (a selo) in Tyumenyakovsky Selsoviet, Tuymazinsky District, Bashkortostan, Russia. The population was 610 as of 2010. There are 10 streets.

Geography 
Agirtamak is located 8 km northeast of Tuymazy (the district's administrative centre) by road. Tuymazy is the nearest rural locality.

References 

Rural localities in Tuymazinsky District